Cerium(III) chloride (CeCl3), also known as cerous chloride or cerium trichloride, is a compound of cerium and chlorine.  It is a white hygroscopic salt; it rapidly absorbs water on exposure to moist air to form a hydrate, which appears to be of variable composition, though the heptahydrate CeCl3·7H2O is known. It is highly soluble in water, and (when anhydrous) it is soluble in ethanol and acetone.

Preparation of waterless CeCl3
Simple rapid heating of the hydrate alone may cause small amounts of hydrolysis.

This may or may not contain a little CeOCl from hydrolysis, but it is suitable for use with organolithium and Grignard reagents. The anhydrous halide may alternatively be prepared from cerium metal and hydrogen chloride. It is usually purified by high temperature sublimation under high vacuum.

Uses
Cerium(III) chloride can be used as a starting point for the preparation of other cerium salts, such as the Lewis acid cerium(III) trifluoromethanesulfonate, used for Friedel-Crafts acylations. It is also used itself as a Lewis acid, for example as a catalyst in Friedel-Crafts alkylation reactions.

Luche reduction of alpha, beta-unsaturated carbonyl compounds has become a popular method in organic synthesis, where CeCl3·7H2O is used in conjunction with sodium borohydride. For example, carvone gives only the allylic alcohol 1 and none of the saturated alcohol 2.  Without CeCl3, a mixture of 1 and 2 is formed.

Another important use in organic synthesis is for alkylation of ketones, which would otherwise form enolates if simple organolithium reagents were to be used. For example, compound 3 would be expected to simply form an enolate without CeCl3 being present, but in the presence of CeCl3 smooth alkylation occurs:

It is reported that organolithium reagents work more effectively in this reaction than do Grignard reagents.

References

Further reading
CRC Handbook of Chemistry and Physics (58th edition), CRC Press, West Palm Beach, Florida, 1977.

Cerium(III) compounds
Chlorides
Lanthanide halides
Acid catalysts